Kinema is a fermented soybean food, prepared by the Nepali communities of the Eastern Himalayas region: Eastern Nepal, and Darjeeling, Kalimpong and Sikkim regions of India. Kinema is a traditional food of the Limbu people, as well as people of other  Kirati communities.

Etymology and history 
The word kinema is believed to be derived from the tribal Limbu word kinambaa, where ki means fermented and nambaa means flavour. It is a traditional food of the Limbu people as well as people of other Kirati communities. It is also called chembihik and hokuma in Bantawa language.

According to Indian microbiologist Jyoti Prakash Tamang, kinema is estimated to have originated around 600 BC to 100 AD during Kirat dynasty rule, introduced by Limbu people.

Consumption 
The slimy, odorous product of fermentation is traditionally prepared into a soup that is consumed with rice, but can also be turned into a savoury dip or a pungent side dish to be consumed along with rice or bread. Kinema is traditionally prepared at home, but now it is sold in local markets and even retailed online as a dried product.

Nutritional value 
Kinema is considered a healthy food because fermentation breaks down complex proteins into easily digestible amino acids. The product is alkaline with pH of 7.89, unlike soyabean which has a pH of 6.75. It has 62% moisture content. 48 g of protein, 28 g of carbohydrate, 17 g of fat and 7 g of ash is found in every 100 g of dry kinema. The energy value of Kinema is 2 MJ per 100 grams. Free fatty acidity in kinema is found to be about 33 times higher than raw soybeans.

Similar foods 

Many other Asian countries have fermented soyabean dishes, such as shuǐdòuchǐ of China, cheonggukjang of Korea, tempeh of Indonesia, nattō of Japan, thua nao of Thailand, tungrymbai of Meghalaya, hawaijaar of Manipur, bekangum of Mizoram, akhuni of Nagaland, and piak of Arunachal Pradesh, India.

Kinema forms one of the vertices of the "natto triangle" proposed by the Japanese ethnobiologist Sasuke Nakao. Jyoti Prakash Tamang proposed a extended ‘KNT (Kinema-Natto-Thua Nao) triangle', connecting the fermented soyabeans across Asia. Nakao considered Yunnan region of China to be the origin place of fermented soyabean technique, as the center of the triangle falls in that region.

See also
Gundruk
Sinki
Masaura
 Nattō  traditional Japanese food made from fermented soybean

References

Nepalese cuisine
Fermented soy-based foods
Limbu culture